Perrissina is a genus of parasitic flies in the family Tachinidae. There are about five described species in Perrissina.

Species
These five species belong to the genus Perrissina:
 Perrissina albiceps Malloch, 1938
 Perrissina brunniceps Malloch, 1938
 Perrissina crocea Malloch, 1938
 Perrissina variceps Malloch, 1938
 Perrissina xanthopyga Malloch, 1938

References

Further reading

 
 
 
 

Tachinidae
Articles created by Qbugbot